Youssouf Vassanogo Kamara (born 10 August 1981, in Dabou) is an Ivorian footballer. He is currently a footballer of Nerostellati Frattese (a team of a small town near Naples)

References

External links

1981 births
Living people
Ivorian footballers
Ivorian expatriate footballers
Association football forwards
Expatriate footballers in Romania
Liga I players
Liga II players
Ivorian expatriates in Italy
FC Argeș Pitești players
Expatriate footballers in Switzerland
ASEC Mimosas players
Ivorian expatriate sportspeople in Switzerland
AC Bellinzona players
Expatriate footballers in Italy
S.S.C. Napoli players
CS Pandurii Târgu Jiu players
Ivorian expatriate sportspeople in Romania
People from Dabou
FC Politehnica Iași (2010) players
A.S.D. Nerostellati Frattese players